Tudo Azul is an album recorded in 1999 by the Velha Guarda da Portela (Portuguese for "Portela's Oldest-Ones"). The album was produced by famous Brazilian singer Marisa Monte, which is featured in one of the tracks. Tudo Azul features tracks written from 1945 to 1972.

Track listing
 "Portela Desde que Eu Nasci" (Monarco) – 1:20
Monarco – lead vocals, cuíca
Jair do Cavaquinho – cavaquinho
 "O Mundo é Assim" (Alvaiade) – 2:20
Paulão – acoustic guitar
Guaracy – seven-string acoustic guitar
Serginho Procópio – cavaquinho
Ronaldo do Bandolim – mandolin
Cabelinho – floor tom
Casemiro da Cuíca – cuíca
Jair do Cavaquinho – tamborim, ganzá, backing vocals
Argemiro – pandeiro, lead vocals, backing vocals
David do Pandeiro – pandeiro, backing vocals
Casquinha – ganzá, snare drum, backing vocals
Monarco – lead vocals, backing vocals
Tia Eunice, Tia Doca, Áurea Maria, Surica – backing vocals
 "Nascer e Florescer" (Manacéa) – 3:51
Mauro Diniz – cavaquinho
Paulão – acoustic guitar
Guaracy – seven-string acoustic guitar
Cabelinho – floor tom
Jair do Cavaquinho – ganzá, tamborim
Casemiro da Cuíca – cuíca
Argemiro – pandeiro
David do Pandeiro – pandeiro
Monarco – lead vocals
Tia Eunice, Tia Doca, Áurea Maria, Surica – backing vocals
 "Vai Saudade" (David do Pandeiro, Candeia) – 1:34
David do Pandeiro – lead vocals, pandeiro
Jair do Cavaquinho – cavaquinho
Argemiro, Casquinha, Monarco, Paulão, Marisa Monte, Pastoras – handclaps
 "Sabiá Cantador" (Alvarenga) – 3:19
Paulão – acoustic guitar
Guaracy – seven-string acoustic guitar
Serginho Procópio – cavaquinho
Ronaldo do Bandolim – tenor guitar
Cabelinho – tan-tan
Casemiro da Cuíca – cuíca
Argemiro – pandeiro, backing vocals
David do Pandeiro – pandeiro, backing vocals
Casquinha – cymbals, backing vocals
Monarco – tamborim, backing vocals
Jair do Cavaquinho – lead vocals, backing vocals
Tia Eunice, Tia Doca, Áurea Maria, Surica – backing vocals
 "A Noite que Tudo Esconde" feat. Paulinho da Viola (Chico Santana/Alvaiade) – 2:42
Mauro Diniz – cavaquinho
Serginho Procópio – cavaquinho
Paulão – acoustic guitar
Guaracy – seven-string acoustic guitar
Roberto Marques – trombone
Cabelinho – ganzá, floor tom
Argemiro – pandeiro
David do Pandeiro – pandeiro
Jair do Cavaquinho – tamborim
Casemiro da Cuíca – cuíca
Monarco – lead vocals
Paulinho da Viola – lead vocals
 "Eu Te Quero" (Jair do Cavaquinho/Colombo) – 1:42
Paulão – acoustic guitar
Jair do Cavaquinho – lead vocals, cavaquinho
Tia Eunice, Tia Doca, Áurea Maria, Surica – backing vocals
 "Volta Meu Amor" feat. Marisa Monte (Manacéa, Áurea Maria) – 4:22
Paulão – acoustic guitar
Guaracy – seven-string acoustic guitar
Serginho Procópio – cavaquinho
Casemiro da Cuíca – cuíca
Cabelinho – floor tom, tamborim
David do Pandeiro – pandeiro, backing vocals
Jair do Cavaquinho – tamborim, matchbox, backing vocals
Casquinha – tamborim, matchbox, backing vocals
Monarco – tamborim, backing vocals
Argemiro – pandeiro, lead vocals, backing vocals
Tia Eunice, Tia Doca, Áurea Maria, Surica – backing vocals
Marisa Monte – lead vocals
 "Falsas Juras" (Casquinha, Candeia) – 2:41
Paulão – acoustic guitar
Guaracy – seven-string acoustic guitar
Serginho Procópio – cavaquinho
Argemiro – pandeiro
David do Pandeiro – pandeiro
Monarco – tamborim
Jair do Cavaquinho – tamborim
Casemiro da Cuíca – cuíca
Cabelinho – floor tom
Roberto Marques – trombone
Casquinha – lead vocals, tamborim, snare drum
Tia Eunice, Tia Doca, Áurea Maria, Surica – backing vocals
 "Tentação" (Casemiro da Cuíca, Ramon Russo) – 1:10
Casemiro da Cuíca – lead vocals, cuíca
 "Você Me Abandonou" (Alberto Lonato) – 2:48
Mauro Diniz – cavaquinho
Paulão – acoustic guitar
Guaracy – seven-string acoustic guitar
Jair do Cavaquinho – tamborim
Monarco – lead vocals, tamborim
Argemiro – pandeiro
David do Pandeiro – pandeiro
Casemiro da Cuíca – cuíca
Cabelinho – floor tom
Casquinha – snare drum
Tia Eunice, Tia Doca, Áurea Maria, Surica – backing vocals
 "Vem Amor" (Casquinha) – 1:00
Jair do Cavaquinho – cavaquinho
Casquinha – lead vocals, percussion, plastic shopping bag
 "Benjamim" (Josias) – 2:04
Paulão – acoustic guitar, steeldrum
Guaracy – seven-string acoustic guitar
Serginho Procópio – cavaquinho
Casemiro da Cuíca – cuíca
Casquinha – snare drum
Jair do Cavaquinho – tamborim
David do Pandeiro – pandeiro, bowl
Argemiro – pandeiro
Cabelinho – floor tom, agogô
Monarco – lead vocals
Tia Eunice, Tia Doca, Áurea Maria, Surica – backing vocals
 "Tudo Azul" (Ventura) – 2:45
Paulão – acoustic guitar
Guaracy – seven-string acoustic guitar
Serginho Procópio – cavaquinho
Casemiro da Cuíca – cuíca
David do Pandeiro – pandeiro, backing vocals
Argemiro – pandeiro, backing vocals
Cabelinho – floor tom, pandeiro
Casquinha – snare drum
Roberto Marques – trombone
Monarco – lead vocals, backing vocals
Jair do Cavaquinho – backing vocals
Tia Eunice, Tia Doca, Áurea Maria, Surica – backing vocals
 "Minha Vontade" feat. Cristina Buarque (Chatim) – 1:18
Paulão – acoustic guitar
Cristina Buarque – lead vocals
Tia Eunice, Tia Doca, Áurea Maria, Surica – backing vocals
 "Sempre Teu Amor" (Manacéa) – 3:05
Mauro Diniz – cavaquinho
Paulão – acoustic guitar
Guaracy – seven-string acoustic guitar
Casquinha – tamborim, backing vocals
Monarco – tamborim, backing vocals
Casquinha – tamborim, lead vocals, backing vocals
Casemiro da Cuíca – cuíca
Argemiro – pandeiro, backing vocals, lead vocals
David do Pandeiro – pandeiro, backing vocals
Jair do Cavaquinho – backing vocals
Tia Eunice, Tia Doca, Áurea Maria, Surica – backing vocals
 "Corri pra Ver" (Chico Santana, Monarco, Casquinha) – 3:28
Mauro Diniz – cavaquinho
Paulão – acoustic guitar, tamborim
Guaracy – seven-string acoustic guitar
Serginho Procópio – cavaquinho
Argemiro – pandeiro, backing vocals
David do Pandeiro – pandeiro, tamborim, backing vocals
Jair do Cavaquinho – tamborim
Cabelinho – pandeiro, agogô, floor tom, tamborim, pea whistle
Monarco – lead vocals, backing vocals
Casquinha – backing vocals
Tia Eunice, Tia Doca, Áurea Maria, Surica – backing vocals
 "Lenço" feat. Zeca Pagodinho (Chico Santana, Monarco) – 3:10
Paulão – acoustic guitar
Guaracy – seven-string acoustic guitar
Serginho Procópio – cavaquinho
Cabelinho – agogô, floor tom, ganzá
Argemiro – pandeiro, backing vocals
David do Pandeiro – pandeiro, backing vocals
Jair do Cavaquinho – tamborim, backing vocals
Casemiro da Cuíca – cuíca
Casquinha – snare drum, backing vocals
Roberto Marques – trombone
Monarco – lead vocals, backing vocals
Zeca Pagodinho – lead vocals

See also
Samba
GRES Portela
Brazilian Carnival

1999 albums